The Flame and the Arrow is a 1950 American Technicolor swashbuckler film made by Warner Bros. and starring Burt Lancaster, Virginia Mayo and Nick Cravat. It was directed by Jacques Tourneur and produced by Harold Hecht and Frank Ross from a screenplay by Waldo Salt. The music score was by Max Steiner and the cinematography by Ernest Haller.

During the 23rd Academy Awards for the films from 1950, it was nominated for Best Cinematography (Color) for Ernest Haller though the award went to Robert Surtees for King Solomon's Mines. A second nomination for the film for Best Musical Score of a Dramatic or Comedy Picture was received by Max Steiner. Still, the award went to Franz Waxman for Sunset Boulevard.

Plot 
In the time of Frederick Barbarossa, in the area of Italy known as Lombardy, Dardo Bartoli (Burt Lancaster) has brought his son Rudi (Gordon Gebert) to the town especially to see Count Ulrich (Frank Allenby), known as "the Hawk", together with his niece, Lady Anne (Virginia Mayo), and his mistress, Dardo's unfaithful wife Francesca (Lynn Baggett). Dardo shows off his skill as an archer by shooting down Ulrich's expensive hunting hawk. In revenge, the count orders that Dardo's son be taken to his castle. Dardo is struck by an arrow while fleeing with Rudi, so the boy allows himself to be captured in order to draw the soldiers away.

At the palace, young Marchese Alessandro de Granazia (Robert Douglas), to whom Ulrich plans to marry Anne's hand for political reasons, refuses to pay Ulrich's taxes; in retaliation, Ulrich orders de Granazia's arrest and confiscation of his lands and property. After his rescue by Dardo, the marchese joins Dardo's band of outlaws. Dardo makes another attempt to free his son. Acting on information provided by his uncle Papa Pietro Bartoli (Francis Pierlot), Dardo obtains the help of Anne's maid (one of Dardo's many lovers) to sneak into Ulrich's castle along with his best friend Piccolo (Cravat), but the rescue proves unsuccessful. When they find themselves in Lady Anne's apartment, Piccolo suggests they kidnap her instead. They take her to their secret hideout. She tries several times to escape, but Dardo is too crafty for her.

Dardo sends a message to the count, offering an exchange of prisoners, but Ulrich threatens to execute papa Pietro unless Anne is released. Dardo and the others race to the village and rescue Bartoli. Then Dardo learns from his aunt Nonna (Aline MacMahon) that five more prisoners have been taken to hang in Papa's place. Dardo gives himself up to save the others and is hanged in front of his son. Ulrich takes the rest of the rebels prisoner, including the marchese.

The marchese informs Ulrich that the rebels are planning an attack the next day and that Dardo is still alive (the executioner had been replaced by Dardo's friend, The Skinner). As a reward for this betrayal, Ulrich agrees to the marchese's marriage to Anne. When she finds out their plans, she warns Nonna Bartoli, with Dardo and his men hiding around the corner. They decide that they must attack at once.

Piccolo comes up with a plan for getting into the castle by the men posing as some of the acrobats providing entertainment. The ruse works. When they are ready, they remove their disguises and a battle ensues. During the melee, Anne warns Dardo that Ulrich has gone for his son. When Dardo catches up to Ulrich, he is in the company of the marchese. The count leaves Dardo and the marchese to fight. Though Dardo tries to persuade the marchese to stand aside, the marchese refuses, trusting in his swordsmanship. But, Dardo manages to plunge the room into darkness, where his hunter's instinct gives him the fatal edge.

Afterwards, Dardo finds his wife dead, killed by a knife in the back while trying to protect Rudi. From the ramparts, he sees the count far below, holding Rudi with a dagger at his throat, using him as a human shield to make his escape.  Dardo finds a bow and, aiming carefully, kills Ulrich and frees his son. With the battle won, Dardo embraces his son and Anne together.

Cast 
 Burt Lancaster as Dardo Bartoli
 Virginia Mayo as Anne de Hesse
 Nick Cravat as Piccolo
 Norman Lloyd as Apollo, the troubadour
 Robert Douglas as Marchese Alessandro de Granazia
 Robin Hughes as Skinner
 Victor Kilian as Apothecary Mazzoni
 Francis Pierlot as Papa Pietro Bartoli
 Aline MacMahon as Nonna Bartoli
 Frank Allenby as Count Ulrich, 'The Hawk'
 Gordon Gebert as Rudi Bartoli
 Lynn Baggett as Francesca

Reception

Box Office 
According to Warner Bros. records, the film earned $2,737,000 domestically and $2,889,000 foreign, making it the studio's most popular film of the year.

Court case 
Warner's offered $1 million to anyone who could prove that Lancaster did not perform all his stunts for the film. Someone claimed that Don Turner performed some of the stunts but Warners refused to pay out and a breach of contract claim was filed. Warner claimed that Turner did not perform the stunts within the term of the offer and that they had withdrawn the offer before the claim. The appeals court judge ruled against the claim.

References

External links 

 
 
 
 

1950 films
1950s historical adventure films
American historical adventure films
American swashbuckler films
Films directed by Jacques Tourneur
Films scored by Max Steiner
Films set in Italy
Films set in the 12th century
Films set in the Holy Roman Empire
Films produced by Harold Hecht
Films produced by Burt Lancaster
Films with screenplays by Waldo Salt
Norma Productions films
Warner Bros. films
1950s English-language films
1950s American films